Glyphodes flavizonalis is a moth in the family Crambidae. It was described by George Hampson in 1898. It is found in Australia, where it has been recorded from Queensland.

The wings are translucent brown, with a pattern of dark brown lines on the forewings.

References

Moths described in 1898
Glyphodes